Gute Nacht is the sixth studio album by German rapper Kontra K. It was released on 28 April 2017 through BMG Rights Management. "Diamanten" was released as the album's lead single on 17 February 2017.

The album debuted at number one in Germany.

Charts

Year-end charts

Certifications

References

2017 albums